Stories of Change is a 2008 documentary film by BRAC Pathways of Women Empowerment.

The documentary focuses on the lives of five women aging from 16 to 60, coming from different walks of life, from different professions, religions and regions of Bangladesh.

The film screened at various film festivals:
 Jeevika: South Asia Livelihood Documentary Festival, Delhi (August 28–31, 2008)
 Asiatica Film Mediale, Rome (November 15–23, 2008)
 Goan Peoples' Film Festival: Celebrating Life and Livelihoods (November 21–29, 2008)
 Kolkata International Documentary Film Festival (January 26–30, 2009)

References

2008 films
2008 documentary films
English-language Bangladeshi films
Bangladeshi documentary films
2000s Bengali-language films
Documentary films about women
Women in Bangladesh